Ya Ribon is an Aramaic piyyut by the 16th-century payytan Israel ben Moses Najara, first published in his 1586 work זמירות ישראל "Songs of Israel". Ashkenazi Jews traditionally sing it at table after the Friday night meal and Sephardi Jews sing it (sometimes in Ladino) among the Baqashot. The piyyut, originally sung to an Arab melody, has been set to dozens of tunes, both ancient and modern. "The 21st century Shabbat table", says one modern writer, "is incomplete without the singing of the universal Yah Ribon."

Form and content 
Najara's best-known work, this piyyut was written in Aramaic, and the first letters of the verses form the author's name ISRAEL by acrostic. An example of the strophic model known in Arabic as muwashshah, the piyyut is composed of equal metrical units and the refrain "Yah, lord for ever and ever/O King, you are king of kings" is repeated after every verse. The piyyut is largely formed from the language of Daniel and incorporates quotes from the Zohar. Unusually for a Sabbath table song, it makes no mention of the Sabbath or its rituals, because it was not originally intended for the Sabbath. Apparently it entered the Sabbath repertoire because of similarity in language to the Sabbath zemirot of Isaac Luria. Max D. Klein's Seder Avodah prayerbook substitutes "who served Thee, Lord, in every age" for the literal "whom Thou chosest from all nations" in what Theodor Gaster understood as a "romantic idealization of the past.

Words

References

Notes 

Aramaic-language songs
Jewish liturgical poems
Zemirot